Edward Holmes may refer to:

Edward Holmes (architect) (1832–1909), English architect
Edward Holmes (field hockey) (1880–1924), Irish field hockey player and Olympic medalist
Edward Holmes (musicologist) (1797–1859), English musicologist and music critic
Edward Lorenzo Holmes (1828–1900), American ophthalmologist
Edward C. Holmes (born 1965), British Australian evolutionary biologist and virologist
Edward Carleton Holmes (1843–1932), one of the solicitors who drew up the first rules of Rugby Football Union
Lefty Holmes, American baseball pitcher

See also
Edward Holmes Baldock (1812–1875), British Conservative Party politician
Ed Holmes, founder of Saint Stupid's Day Parade